The following shows the public housing estates (including Home Ownership Scheme (HOS), Private Sector Participation Scheme (PSPS), Tenants Purchase Scheme (TPS) and Sandwich Class Housing Scheme (SCHS)) in Pok Fu Lam, Aberdeen, Wong Chuk Hang and Ap Lei Chau of Southern District, Hong Kong.

Overview

Ap Lei Chau Estate 

Ap Lei Chau Estate is a public estate in Ap Lei Chau. It is the first public housing estate in Ap Lei Chau. Completed in two phases in 1980 and 1982 respectively, the estate consists of 8 residential blocks providing 4,453 flats. It was one of the public housing estates built from 1980 to 1982 to accommodate people affected by a major fire in Aberdeen Typhoon Shelter.

Houses

Broadview Court 

Broadview Court is a HOS and PSPS court in Shum Wan Road, Wong Chuk Hang, next to the Aberdeen Marina Club and Ocean Park. Jointly developed by the Hong Kong Housing Authority and COSCO International, the court has a total of 4 blocks built in 2001. The entire housing estate is composed of four residential buildings, which are located on the Sham Wan Bus Terminal, a multi-storey car park and a retail platform. Two residential buildings with 38 floors and two 39 floors with fire barriers, a total of 1,540 Residential units. The units are divided into two-bedrooms and two-living rooms and three-bedrooms and two-living rooms. The building area is 505-707 square feet. Most of the units can enjoy sea views such as the deep bay and the marina.

Houses

Facilities Nearby 

 Aberdeen Marina Club
 Pao Yue Kong Swimming Pool
 Shum Wan Road Public Transport Terminus
 Marine Police Aberdeen Base

Landmarks Nearby 

 Jumbo Kingdom
 Ocean Park Hong Kong
 Marinella
 Larvotto

Hung Fuk Court 

Hung Fuk Court is a HOS court in Tin Wan, Aberdeen, near Tin Wan Estate. It consists of 2 blocks completed in 1997.

Houses

Ka Lung Court 

Ka Lung Court is a HOS court on the reclaimed land of Kellett Bay in Tin Wan Praya Road, Pok Fu Lam, next to Wah Kwai Estate. It comprises 4 blocks built in 1991.

Ka Lung Court is in Primary One Admission (POA) School Net 18. Within the school net are multiple aided schools (operated independently but funded with government money) and Hong Kong Southern District Government Primary School (香港南區官立小學).

Houses

Lei Tung Estate 

Lei Tung Estate is a mixed public and Tenants Purchase Scheme (TPS) estate in Ap Lei Chau near Lei Tung station. Built at a hill called Yuk Kwai Shan, it is the second public housing estate in Ap Lei Chau. It is developed into a self-contained community with various kinds of recreational and commercial facilities. It consists of 8 residential blocks with 2 blocks of Trident I type and 6 blocks of Trident II type, built between 1987 and 1988 with a total of about 7,500 units. In 2004, some of the flats were sold to tenants through Tenants Purchase Scheme Phase 6A.

Houses

Marina Habitat 

Marina Habitat is a Sandwich Class Housing Scheme court in Ap Lei Chau developed by the Hong Kong Housing Society, built on the reclaimed land outside Ap Lei Chau Main Street on the waterfront of Ap Lei Chau. It consists of 3 residential towers on top of a 3-storey podium.

Houses

Ocean Court 

Ocean Court is a HOS and PSPS court on the reclaimed land in Aberdeen, located on the waterfront of Aberdeen Praya Road. The residential development was built in 2000, and it comprises three 31-storey residential towers providing 550 domestic units.

Houses

Shek Pai Wan Estate 

Shek Pai Wan Estate is a public estate in Shek Pai Wan, the hillside at the east of Aberdeen, Hong Kong. It comprises 7 residential blocks, a non-standard small household block, a primary school, a shopping centre and a bus terminus.

South Wave Court 

South Wave Court is a HOS and PSPS court beside Nam Long Shan in Wong Chuk Hang, near Sham Wan and Aberdeen Marina Club. It has 3 blocks built in 1995.

Houses

Tin Wan Estate 

Tin Wan Estate is a public estate in Tin Wan, to the west of Aberdeen.

Background 
Tin Wan Estate was a resettlement estate which had a total of 15 blocks built between 1962 and 1965. The blocks were demolished in 1992 and replaced by 5 residential buildings in 1997.

Houses

Wah Fu Estate 

Wah Fu Estate is a public estate located by the Kellett Bay, Pok Fu Lam. Divided into Wah Fu (I) Estate and Wah Fu (II) Estate, the whole estate has a total of 18 residential blocks completed between 1967 and 1978.

Wah Kwai Estate 

Wah Kwai Estate is a mixed public and TPS estate on the reclaimed land of Kellett Bay, Pok Fu Lam, located near Wah Fu Estate. The estate consists of 6 residential buildings built in 1990 and 1991. In 1998, some of the flats were sold to tenants through Tenants Purchase Scheme Phase 1.

Wah Kwai Estate is in Primary One Admission (POA) School Net 18. Within the school net are multiple aided schools (operated independently but funded with government money) and Hong Kong Southern District Government Primary School (香港南區官立小學).

Houses

Yue Fai Court 

Yue Fai Court is a Home Ownership Scheme court in Shek Pai Wan, Aberdeen, near Shek Pai Wan Estate and Yue Kwong Chuen. It consists of 6 blocks completed in 1980, and it was one of the earliest HOS courts in Hong Kong.

Houses

Yue Kwong Chuen 

Yue Kwong Chuen is a public estate in Aberdeen, developed by the HKHS, and it is the only estate in Southern District developed by the Hong Kong Housing Society.

The estate comprises 5 blocks built in 1962, 1963 and 1965 respectively. It is the second oldest existing public housing estate developed by the Hong Kong Housing Society (the first one is Ming Wah Dai Ha), and also the oldest one in Southern District.

Houses

Yue On Court 

Yue On Court is a HOS court in Ap Lei Chau, near Aberdeen South Typhoon Shelter, Lei Tung Estate and Lei Tung station. It comprises 7 Cruciform blocks of 35 storeys.

Houses

References 

Pok Fu Lam
Aberdeen, Hong Kong
Wong Chuk Hang
Ap Lei Chau